Rakov Potok  is a village in Croatia. It is connected by the D1 highway.

The area is known to have several mass graves from World War II. In 2011, it emerged that the area likely contained the remains of the last government of the Independent State of Croatia executed in 1945.

References

Populated places in Zagreb County